Getta baetifica is a moth of the family Notodontidae first described by Herbert Druce in 1898. It is endemic to the western slopes of the Andes in Colombia and Ecuador.

Larvae have been reared on Passiflora macrophylla and Passiflora arborea.

External links
"Getta baetifica (Druce 1898)". Tree of Life Web Project. Retrieved December 28, 2019.

Notodontidae of South America
Moths described in 1898